Flood Entrance Pot (sometimes known as Flood Exit Pot) is one of the entrances to the Gaping Gill cave system located about  south of Gaping Gill Main Shaft. It was the first alternative entrance into the main system to be explored, and it is now a popular entrance into the system, with a fine  pitch landing in Gaping Gill's South-East Passage. It lies within the designated Ingleborough Site of Special Scientific Interest.

Description

A climb down in the small shakehole soon leads to a tight  pitch. At the bottom the passage passes beneath the aven where Wade's Entrance joins, and after a further  it goes round a series of bends to where the last pitch of OBJ Hole enters. There is a chamber after a further  where a small stream enters from an inlet passage. This is a window into a large underwater passage, and dye tests have shown that the water from Gaping Gill Main Chamber and from Stream Passage Pot flow through this passage. Above the final shaft there is a tight passage, Horrocks-Stearn Crawl, which connects to Bar Pot above its main pitch.

A  climb down lands at the top of a  pitch  which drops into the passage a few metres downstream of the Flood Entrance Pot entrance pitch. This is a very much easier than the original entrance, and is the voie normale.

The way on is actually at the base of the second pitch where a tight rift leads into an equally tight inlet that enters the roof of the main passage in Flood Entrance Pot.

History

They commented on the high aven above it, which later proved to be the last Pitch of Flood Entrance Pot. The shaft was bottomed in May of the following year.

Flood Entrance Pot was first entered in 1909 by the Yorkshire Speleological Association who were motivated to look for an entrance after finding some flies and a red worm at the bottom of South-East Pot. They concluded that these must have come from the surface having descended the high aven above. It gained its name as it allowed the Gaping Gill system to be entered even when the Main Shaft was in flood.

Wade's Entrance was opened up by the Bradford Pothole Club in 1957. Eric Wade failing to get through the entrance squeeze in Flood Entrance, dug in an adjacent shakehole and got through after getting a voice connection.

OBJ Pot was opened up by the British Speleological Association in August 1949. It took its name from a beer brewed by Dutton's brewery in Blackburn (the initials stand for Oh be joyful). The connection was finally made with Flood Entrance Pot by Bradford Pothole Club in May 2010, who enlarged the rift at the bottom of the second pitch.

In 1980 Lancaster University Speleological Society published a comprehensive survey and description of the cave.

References

External links
Full on-line description of the system

Caves of North Yorkshire
Wild caves
Limestone caves